Wali Tasar Uddin, MBE (born 17 April 1952) is a Bangladeshi-born British entrepreneur, restaurateur, community leader and humanitarian.

Early life
Uddin was born on 17 April 1952 in Moulvibazar, Sylhet District, East Bengal, Pakistan (now Bangladesh). He completed his secondary education at Moulvibazar Government High School. In 1967, at the age of 15, he moved to the United Kingdom, where he earned a Higher National Certificate (HNC) from Putney College of Further Education and began to work in restaurants in London. In 1975, he married Sydea, and the following year they moved to Edinburgh, Scotland.

Community work
Uddin has received many awards for his contribution and work in the communities. In 1984, he was appointed as the Justice of the peace, the first Bangladeshi to hold the post, and from 1993 to 1997 he became the first Bangladeshi to be a member of the Honorary Consul in Scotland.

Business career
Uddin is also notable for being successful in the Indian restaurant industry in Scotland, most notably for owning the "Britannia Spice" restaurant, which has received over 10 awards for being one of the top restaurants in Scotland. His son now runs the "Verandah on Haymarket", which has been frequented by A-list celebrities, including Clint Eastwood and Sir Cliff Richard. He also has long chain of Indian restaurant companies throughout the United Kingdom, and is the chairman of the Universal Koba Corporation Limited.

Other work
Uddin is the current chairman of the British-Bangladesh Chamber of Commerce, which was created in 1991. The Chamber has operated as a networking business hub for the British Bangladeshi community who have British business or interests in Bangladesh. The organisation has held a number of trade and investment meetings with such as the Home Secretary and the then Prime Minister of Bangladesh.

Awards, recognition and honours
In 1995, Uddin was appointed a Member of the Order of the British Empire (MBE) in the 1995 New Year Honours for his services to race relations.

In 2007, Uddin received an honorary doctorate from Heriot-Watt University.

Personal life
Uddin is married to Syeda, and has five children. Uddin's nephew is businessman Foysol Choudhury.

See also
British Bangladeshi
Business of British Bangladeshis
List of British Bangladeshis

References

Further reading

External links

Wali Tasar Uddin receives Lifetime Achievement Award.
Britannia Spice website
News from Bangladesh

1952 births
Living people
British Muslims
Bangladeshi emigrants to Scotland
British people of Bangladeshi descent
Naturalised citizens of the United Kingdom
British businesspeople in retailing
Bangladeshi businesspeople
People from Moulvibazar District
Members of the Order of the British Empire